"Up with the White and Gold" is a fight song at the Georgia Institute of Technology. It is generally played after a touchdown in a Georgia Tech Yellow Jackets football game. The song's title refers to Georgia Tech's school colors and its lyrics contain the phrase, "Down with the Red and Black", an explicit reference to the school colors of the University of Georgia and the then-budding Georgia–Georgia Tech rivalry.

Oh well it's up with the White and Gold,
Down with the Red and Black,
Georgia Tech is out for a victory.
We'll drop the battle-axe on georgia's head,
When we meet her our team is sure to beat her.
Down on the old farm there will be no sound
Till our bow-wows rip through the air;
When the battle is over Georgia's team will be found
With the Yellow Jackets swarming around!

References
 

1919 songs
American college songs
College fight songs in the United States
Atlantic Coast Conference fight songs
Georgia Tech Yellow Jackets